Incheh may refer to various places in Iran:
 Incheh, Meshgin Shahr, Ardabil Province
 Incheh, Nir, Ardabil Province
 Incheh-ye Olya (disambiguation)
 Incheh-ye Sofla (disambiguation)
 Incheh Rahbari
 Incheh-ye Khoda Bandehlu
 Incheh, Shahin Dezh, West Azerbaijan Province
 Incheh, Keshavarz, Shahin Dezh County, West Azerbaijan Province
 Incheh-ye Hajj Mohammad, West Azerbaijan province
 Incheh-ye Nurollah, West Azerbaijan Province
 Incheh-ye Said Nezam